Delta State University Teach Hospital (popularly known as DELSUTH), was inaugurated on the 10th of June, 2020 by Goodluck Jonathan, former president of the federal republic of Nigeria, to provide tertiary health care through training of undergraduate medical students at the Delta State University, Abraka. The facility was located at Oghara in Ethiope West Local Government Area of Delta State, South East, Nigeria. 

Delta State University Teaching Hospital (DELSUTH) is an affiliate of the Delta State University (Abraka).

References 

Hospitals established in 2020
Teaching hospitals in Nigeria 
Medical research institutes in Nigeria